In economics, the throw away paradox is a situation in which a person can gain by throwing away some of his property. It was first described by Robert J. Aumann and B. Peleg as a note on a similar paradox by David Gale.

Description 
There is an economy with two commodities (x and y) and two traders (e.g. Alice and Bob). 
 In one situation, the initial endowments are (20,0) and (0,10), i.e, Alice has twenty units of commodity x and Bob has ten units of commodity y. Then, the market opens for trade. In equilibrium, Alice's bundle is (4,2), i.e, she has four units of x and two units of y. 
 In the second situation, Alice decides to discard half of her initial endowment - she throws away 10 units of commodity x. Then, the market opens for trade. In equilibrium, Alice's bundle is (5,5) - she has more of every commodity than in the first situation.

Details 
The paradox happens in the following situation. Both traders have the same utility function with the following characteristics:
 It is a homothetic utility function. 

The explanation for the paradox is that when the quantity of x decreases, its price increases, and the increase in price is more than sufficient to compensate Alice for the decrease in quantity.

See also 
 Paradox of Plenty
 Resource monotonicity

References 

Paradoxes in economics